Lake Norden is a city in Hamlin County, South Dakota, United States. It is part of the Watertown, South Dakota Micropolitan Statistical Area. The population was 554 at the 2020 census.

Lake Norden was laid out in 1908, and named after a lake near the town site.

Attractions
Lake Norden is the home of the South Dakota Amateur Baseball Hall of Fame.

The Agropur, Inc. plant in Lake Norden employs roughly as many people as the amount that live in the town. In 2019 the plant completed an addition that tripled daily cheese output to just under a million pounds a day. It produces and ships many food ingredients, including whey protein products and cheeses.

Geography

Lake Norden is located at  (44.581570, -97.208406).

Lake Norden has been assigned the ZIP code 57248 and the FIPS place code 35460.

Demographics

2010 census
As of the census of 2010, there were 467 people, 175 households, and 106 families residing in the city. The racial makeup of the city was 93.1% White, 0.4% Native American, 5.6% from other races, and 0.9% from two or more races. Hispanic or Latino of any race were 7.3% of the population.

There were 175 households, of which 28.0% had children under the age of 18 living with them, 49.7% were married couples living together, 6.9% had a female householder with no husband present, 4.0% had a male householder with no wife present, and 39.4% were non-families. 35.4% of all households were made up of individuals, and 17.7% had someone living alone who was 65 years of age or older. The average household size was 2.31 and the average family size was 3.02.

The median age in the city was 46.4 years. 21.8% of residents were under the age of 18; 8.5% were between the ages of 18 and 24; 19.5% were from 25 to 44; 21% were from 45 to 64; and 29.3% were 65 years of age or older. The gender makeup of the city was 46.0% male and 54.0% female.

2000 census
As of the census of 2000, there were 432 people, 172 households, and 99 families residing in the city. The population density was 654.3 people per square mile (252.7/km2). There were 193 housing units at an average density of 292.3 per square mile (112.9/km2). The racial makeup of the city was 97.92% White, 1.39% Native American, 0.23% Asian, 0.23% from other races, and 0.23% from two or more races. Hispanic or Latino of any race were 0.93% of the population. 29.6% were of Norwegian, 26.8% German, 14.0% Finnish, and 7.5% Swedish ancestry according to Census 2000.

There were 172 households, out of which 26.7% had children under the age of 18 living with them, 49.4% were married couples living together, 5.8% had a female householder with no husband present, and 41.9% were non-families. 38.4% of all households were made up of individuals, and 19.8% had someone living alone who was 65 years of age or older. The average household size was 2.22 and the average family size was 3.01.

In the city, the population was spread out, with 21.8% under the age of 18, 7.2% from 18 to 24, 23.4% from 25 to 44, 19.2% from 45 to 64, and 28.5% who were 65 years of age or older. The median age was 43 years. For every 100 females, there were 91.2 males. For every 100 females age 18 and over, there were 88.8 males.

The median income for a household in the city was $28,194, and the median income for a family was $42,000. Males had a median income of $26,667 versus $14,063 for females. The per capita income for the city was $14,852. About 7.4% of families and 14.2% of the population were below the poverty line, including 6.6% of those under age 18 and 26.4% of those age 65 or over.

References

Cities in South Dakota
Cities in Hamlin County, South Dakota
Watertown, South Dakota micropolitan area
1908 establishments in South Dakota